John Barsa was an American government official who served as acting administrator of the United States Agency for International Development in 2020. He became acting deputy administrator on November 7, 2020, to circumvent the Federal Vacancies Reform Act of 1998, which required him to step down, and the administrator's position was left vacant.

Early life and education 
The son of a Cuban refugee, Barsa was raised in Miami, Florida. He earned a Bachelor of Arts in international affairs from Florida International University and a graduate diploma from the Syracuse University National Security Management Fellows Program at the Maxwell School of Citizenship and Public Affairs.

Career 
Barsa began his career working in the defense sector. Barsa enlisted in the United States Army Reserve as a Corporal and served on the staff of U.S. Representative Lincoln Díaz-Balart. During the George W. Bush Administration, Barsa worked as a legislative affairs special assistant at NASA. After the Department of Homeland Security was established, Barsa worked in the department's Office of Public Liaison. In 2011, Barsa was a Republican candidate for the Virginia House of Delegates, losing to incumbent Democrat Scott Surovell.

Trump administration 
Barsa was on the Donald Trump transition team and later an assistant to then-DHS director John F. Kelly. Barsa was later transferred to the United States Agency for International Development where he became Assistant Administrator for the Bureau for Latin America and the Caribbean.

Barsa became acting administrator on April 13, 2020, after the resignation of Mark Andrew Green. Under the Federal Vacancies Reform Act of 1998, he was required to step down after 210 days unless he was nominated for the position and confirmed by the U.S. Senate. He was not nominated for the role. Instead, on November 6, 2020, after losing the election, Trump fired Deputy Administrator Bonnie Glick in order to allow Barsa to take her position in an acting capacity.

Personal life 
Barsa is married to Lisa Piraneo Barsa, a lobbyist for ACT! for America. The couple have two children. In 2019, Piraneo's relationship with Barsa was scrutinized after an ACT! for America poster featuring Congresswoman Ilhan Omar superimposed over a picture of the Twin Towers falling was hung in the West Virginia House of Delegates.

References 

Living people
Trump administration personnel
Virginia Republicans
People of the United States Agency for International Development
Administrators of the United States Agency for International Development
Florida International University alumni
Syracuse University alumni
Year of birth missing (living people)